"Morgens Pauken" (Cramming in the morning) is a song by German rock band Die Ärzte. It's the fifth track and the first single from their 2020 album Hell. The song is a satirical ode to the punk scene and everything being punk, making references to Frank Zappa, Frank Zander and the punk legends GG Allin and Sid Vicious. The title however appears nowhere in the lyrics.

Personnel
Rodrigo González – lead vocals, bass
Farin Urlaub – vocals (chorus and bridge), guitar, talk box
Bela B. – drums, intro scream

Charts 

2020 singles
Die Ärzte songs
Songs written by Farin Urlaub
2020 songs